The 2016 Democratic Party leadership election was held on 15 September 2016. It was the party's first election since the formation of the party from the merger of the Democratic Party of Japan and the Japan Innovation Party. The race determined the successor of acting president Katsuya Okada who decided against running for a full term.

Candidates

Running 
Renho, former cabinet minister and sitting member of the House of Councillors.
Seiji Maehara, former party president (2005–06) and Minister of Foreign Affairs (2010-11).
Yuichiro Tamaki, member of the House of Representatives and former bureaucrat.

Potential or has publicly expressed interest 
Akihisa Nagashima, former vice defense minister.

Declined to run 
Katsuya Okada, acting party president.
Goshi Hosono, former party policy chief and candidate in the 2015 DPJ presidential election.

Results 
Voting was held on 15 September, following a campaign period from 2 September.

References 

2016 elections in Japan
Political party leadership elections in Japan
September 2016 events in Japan
Democratic Party (Japan, 2016) leadership election